was a Japanese woodblock printer, one of the major postwar artists of the sosaku hanga ("creative print") movement.

Early life
Sekino Jun'ichirō was born in 1914 in the Yasukata district of Aomori, Aomori Prefecture, in northern Japan. From a young age he immersed himself in the study of printmaking. In middle school he started a magazine Ryokuju-mu ("Dream of Green Foliage") devoted to poetry and print.

Sekino studied at Nishida Takeo's Japanese Etching Institute and enrolled at private school to learn oil painting and drawing.  From 1931 he studied intaglio printmaking and lithography under Kon Junzō who considered his pupil "an artistic genius."

In 1935 Sekino submitted an etching of Aomori harbor to a government sponsored Teiten exhibition and won a first prize. Later the same year he was awarded a prize for print exhibited at the Nihon Hanga Kyokai (Japanese Print Association).  He joined the Nihon Hanga Kyokai in 1938, and the Kokugakai (National Picture Association) in 1940.

Career
In April 1939 Sekino moved to Tokyo where he was employed by publisher Shimo Taro and met Kōshirō Onchi. He was one of the founding members of Onchi's Ichimokukai (First Thursday Society), where he was considered Onchi's "right-hand man." During the Second World War, Sekino procured lodging and theater facilities for entertainment troupes. Through this role he met famous kabuki actor Nakamura Kichiemon I whose woodblock portrait he produced in 1947. Alongside further depictions of artists such as Shikō Munakata and Onchi, it became one of his most renowned pieces, and established him as the country's pre-eminent woodblock portraitist. 

Besides portraits, Sekino produced still lifes, landscapes (both rural scenes and cityscapes), depictions of animals, and abstract works. He also worked in lithography and etching, and in 1953 founded the Japanese Etchers Society.

In 1958, at the invitation of the Japan Society, Sekino taught at America's Pratt Institute. In 1963 Gordon Gilkey of the Oregon State University hired him to teach a class. He also taught at the University of Washington and worked in New Mexico at the Tamarind Studio where he studied with Glen Alps, the inventor of collography. In 1969 he returned to Oregon State where, in 1975, his series depicting the Fifty-three Stations of the Tōkaidō was exhibited with Hiroshige's famous 1834 version.

Prints
Sekino was influenced by German Renaissance artist Albrecht Dürer and stated that, "one of the things I like most about him is his thoroughness, his corner-to-corner completeness."

Sekino created over 400 prints. His years of studying printmaking techniques enabled him to produce work of a consistent and extremely high quality, in excess of most of his contemporary sosaku hanga artists.  Onchi honoured him in allowing Sekino to reprint his Portrait of Hagiwara Sakutaro, and he assisted Maekawa Senpan in his Hot Spring Notes series.

As well as the Fifty-Three Stations, Sekino created series such as: Old Capital, Prints of the Narrow Road to the Deep North, Collection of Aomori Folk Toys and Collection of Famous Japan Folk Toys.  He contributed to Onchi's 1945 series Scenes of Last Tokyo (Tokyo kaiko zue).

Notes

References

 
 Merritt, Helen. Modern Japanese Woodblock Prints - The Early Years, University of Hawaii Press, 1998, p. 240-241<ref>
 Merritt, Helen. Guide to Modern Japanese Woodblock Prints: 1900-1975, University of Hawaii Press, 1992, p. 133-134; 
 Petit, Gaston. 44 Modern Japanese Print Artists, Volume II, Kodansha International Ltd., 1973, p. 120
 Statler, Oliver. Modern Japanese Prints, p. 63-64.
 Fiorillo, John "The Art of Sekino Jun'ichirō: Expressive Realism and Geometric Formalism" in Andon (The Journal of the Society for Japanese Arts), Autumn 2017, No. 104, p. 77.

External links
 Sekino World website

1914 births
1988 deaths
Japanese printmakers
Artists from Aomori Prefecture
People from Aomori (city)
Sosaku hanga artists